Lipoyl synthase is an enzyme that belongs to the radical SAM (S-adenosyl methionine) family. Within the radical SAM superfamily, lipoyl synthase is in a sub-family of enzymes that catalyze sulfur insertion reactions. Enzymes in this family contain two 4Fe-4S clusters, from which they obtain the sulfur groups that will be transferred onto the corresponding substrates. This particular enzyme participates in lipoic acid metabolism, so it transfers two sulfur atoms from its 4Fe-4S cluster onto the protein N6-(octanoyl)lysine through radical generation. This enzyme is usually localized to the mitochondria. Two organisms that have been extensively studied with regards to this enzyme are Escherichia coli and Mycobacterium tuberculosis. It is also found in other organisms, such as yeast and plants.

Nomenclature 
The systematic name of this enzyme class is protein N6-(octanoyl)lysine:sulfur sulfurtransferase. Other names in common use include:

 LS,
 LipA,
 lipoate synthase, and
 protein 6-N-(octanoyl)lysine:sulfur sulfurtransferase.

Mechanism of lipoyl synthase 
Lipoyl synthase uses two sulfurs from one of its two [4Fe-4S] clusters and attaches them to the 6th and 8th carbon of the protein N6-(octanoyl)lysine substrate, to convert it into protein N6-(lipoyl)lysine. The other [4Fe-4S] cluster is coordinated by the radical SAM motif of the enzyme (CxxxCxxC) and participates in radical SAM characteristic chemistry to activate the substrate for subsequent sulfur insertion. Below is the overall reaction for this enzyme:

protein N6-(octanoyl)lysine + 2 sulfur + 2 S-adenosyl-L-methionine <=> protein N6-(lipoyl)lysine + 2 L-methionine + 2 5'-deoxyadenosine

All in all, the 3 substrates of this enzyme are protein N6-(octanoyl)lysine, sulfur, and S-adenosyl-L-methionine, whereas its 3 products are protein N6-(lipoyl)lysine, L-methionine, and 5'-deoxyadenosine.

Importance of lipoyl synthase 
This enzyme participates in lipoic acid metabolism, where it performs the final step in lipoic acid biosynthesis. Lipoic acid is a cofactor that has different functions within different organisms. The lipoic acid generation in yeast cells increases the number of divisions in the cells as well as protects yeast cells from hydrogen peroxide. Lipoic acid is an important co-factor in many enzyme systems, and one of them is the pyruvate dehydrogenase complex. Studies that repressed the function of lipoyl synthase in Arabidopsis thaliana seeds showed that this did not have adverse effects on seed growth and weight, but shortened the generation time as well as the flowering time of the plants. Repression resulted in earlier flowering times and decreased the generation times between seeds by almost 10%.

Possible side effects 
Overexpression of this enzyme in sunflower plants has been found to eventually sequester the amount of SAM present in transgenic Arabidopsis plants. SAM is a molecule that is required in other enzymatic complexes found in this plant as well, as well as the overall structure of the plant, so this sequestration may cause a reduction in the fatty acid biosynthesis in the Arabidopsis seeds.

References 

EC 2.8.1
Enzymes of unknown structure